León and Olvido (León y Olvido in Spanish, León e Olvido in Galician) is a 2004 Spanish movie.

Plot
León and Olvido are two orphan twin siblings. Their relationship is very contradictory, León has Down syndrome and Olvido loves him, but she thinks she has no choice but to look after him…

Awards
Premio especial del Jurado en el Festival de Cine Español de Málaga (2004).
39th Karlovy Vary International Film Festival: Best Director (Xavier Bermúdez) & Best Actress (Marta Larralde) (2004)
Public Price in Athens International Festival  (2004)
CineEspaña Festival in Toulouse, Best script, Best Actress  (Marta Larralde) (2004)
Independent Cinema Ourense Festival: Best Director (Xavier Bermúdez) Best Actress (Marta Larralde) (2004)
Black Nights Film Festival (Tallinn /Estonia) (2004)
FIPRESCI Price and Special Mention to Guillem Jiménez in Tbilisi Film Festival (Tbilisi, Georgia) (2006)

External links

Synopsis of the film of the Karlovy Vary IFF
Information
Information

2004 films
2000s Spanish-language films
Galician-language films
2004 drama films
Down syndrome in film
Spanish drama films
2000s Spanish films